Admiral Reynolds may refer to:

Barrington Reynolds (1786–1861), British Royal Navy admiral
John Reynolds (Royal Navy officer) (c. 1713–1788), British Royal Navy admiral
Robert Carthew Reynolds (1745–1811), British Royal Navy rear admiral
William Reynolds (naval officer) (1815–1879), U.S. Navy rear admiral
William E. Reynolds (1860–1944), U.S. Coast Guard rear admiral